Park Bo-gyoon (born 24 January 1954) is a South Korean journalist current serving as Minister of Culture, Sports and Tourism under the Yoon Suk-yeol government.

References 

1954 births
Living people
People from Seoul
Korea University alumni
South Korean journalists
Culture ministers of South Korea